Vector Limited is an electricity and gas distribution company in Auckland, New Zealand. It is the national number one provider of electricity distribution, number one provider of electricity and gas metering and number two wholesaler of LPG. It also owns a fibre optic cable network.

Entrust, formerly named Auckland Energy Consumer Trust, owns around three quarters of its shares, and had full ownership until 2005.

History

Auckland Electric Power Board
The Auckland Electric Power Board (AEPB) was formed in 1922, taking over the generation, distribution and supply of electricity from several local councils. All electricity was generated locally until 1925 when the transmission line from Horahora Power Station to Penrose substation was commissioned. The AEPB was connected to the newly completed Arapuni Power Station in 1929.

Under the government reforms introduced by the Energy Companies Act 1992, the Auckland Electric Power Board was corporatised and became Mercury Energy Limited, a company owned by the Auckland Energy Consumer Trust (AECT).

Auckland Energy Consumer Trust
The AECT was established, along with 29 other energy trusts throughout the country,  to ensure that the power lines remained in the control of electricity consumers.

The AECT retained 100% ownership of Vector until 2005, when they agreed to Vector's initial public offering, or share float, of 24.9% of the shares in Vector, so it could raise money to buy gas company NGC Holdings. (Vector has since gone on to invest in other businesses too.) The result of this share float, and a subsequent buy back of shares in 2009, is that the AECT holds 75.4% of Vector's shares, a controlling interest.

The AECT has had guardianship of Vector on behalf of the Auckland community only since 1993. However, the idea of community ownership of Auckland's power network goes back much further than that. The Auckland Electric Power Board was set up in 1922 as a consumer-owned utility. (Before that, electricity distribution was looked after by local councils.) Even back then, the AEPB's founders understood the value and importance of electricity supply to Aucklanders, and this model of guardianship of electricity distribution for the good of the entire community continues today with the AECT.

Mercury Energy Limited
When incorporated, Mercury Energy Limited owned the distribution business in Auckland, Manukau and Papakura, and also retailed electricity to customers connected to the network and elsewhere. Further government reforms were introduced by the Electricity Industry Reform Act 1998. These reforms prohibited one business from being involved in distribution and generation as well as retail. So the retail business of Mercury Energy Limited was sold to Mighty River Power, a state-owned enterprise, which continued to use the name as a trading name, and in 2016 changed its company name to Mercury Energy .

Vector Limited
Mercury Energy Limited changed its name to Vector Limited and kept its lines business. A flotation on the local stock exchange in 2005 provided funds for further acquisitions and expansion of its fibre optics network

Subsequent acquisitions
 UnitedNetworks was bought in 2002. It was a lines company operating on Auckland's North Shore and Waitakere which included a telecommunications network and Auckland's gas network. This purchase made Vector the largest multi-utility company in New Zealand.
 NGC Holdings (gas) bought from Australian Gas Light (AGL). Two-thirds in 2004, the balance in 2005. This gas transmission and distribution business was sold in 2016, becoming Firstgas, although Vector retained ownership the Auckland gas distristibution network.
 NZ Windfarms A 19.99% cornerstone shareholding was bought in 2007 and later increased to 22 percent.
 Advanced Metering Services, a joint venture with Siemens (NZ) to provide advanced metering technology and services. Established 2007, the remaining 50 percent was bought from Siemens in 2010.
 Arc Innovations, a subsidiary of Meridian Energy, was acquired in November 2014.

Sale of Wellington electricity network
Vector sold its Wellington electricity network in 2008 to Cheung Kong Infrastructure Holdings Limited of Hong Kong for $785 million. The network was renamed Wellington Electricity.

NZIER report on the AECT
In 2006 the New Zealand Institute of Economic Research compared Trust ownership of Vector with four alternatives (local council ownership, management by a professional trust company, handing shares over to beneficiaries, local councils and the Auckland Regional Council, and transfer of shares to a new regional infrastructure body).
On every measure, including efficiency and what was best for energy consumers in the Trust area, the NZIER concluded that the current setup is the best option.

Vector's customers hold 75.1% of its shares through the Auckland Energy Consumer Trust, and 24.9% of its shares are traded on the NZX. An annual dividend of $150–320 is paid to each customer in the Trust area. Two of Vector's directors are trustees of the Auckland Energy Consumer Trust. The Trust's close relationship with the Vector board of directors has been under scrutiny by the media and the New Zealand Commerce Commission during the mid-2000s, and some have called for the trust to be disbanded, with Vector shares instead to be handed over directly to the beneficiaries of the trust. The proposal however gained no general support.

Electricity distribution
Vector owns and operates the electricity sub-transmission and distribution networks across the majority of the Auckland Region, from Wellsford in the north to central Papakura in the south, and over the Tamaki Strait to Waiheke Island. The network consists of 18,116 km of lines, fifty-four percent of which is underground, at voltages of 110 kV, 33 kV, 22 kV,11 kV and 400 V. Electricity is taken from Transpower's national grid at fourteen grid exit points: Wellsford, Silverdale, Albany, Wairau Road, Henderson and Hepburn Road for the northern network, and Mount Roskill, Hobson Street, Penrose, Otahuhu, Pakuranga, Mangere, Wiri, and Takanini for the southern network. Due to differing vector groups, the only distribution level connection between the northern and southern networks is via a phase-shifting transformer between Avondale zone substation (Mount Roskill) and Brickworks zone substation (Hepburn Road). In October 2016, Vector installed a 1MW/2.3MWh lithium-ion battery for grid strengthening near Glen Innes in Auckland. It consists of 24 Powerpacks.

In the year to 31 March 2016, the Vector distribution network had a normalised System Average Interruption Duration Index (SAIDI) of 226.2 minutes and a normalised System Average Interruption Frequency Index (SAIFI) of 2.14. This level of network reliability means that on average, each customer typically experiences a power outage of 1 hour 45 minutes duration every 5 to 6 months.

References

Further reading
King, Jennifer. Sign of Service: A history of the Auckland Electric Power Board. History of the AEPB (and electricity in Auckland in general).

External links
 

1999 establishments in New Zealand
Consumers' cooperatives
Electric power distribution network operators in New Zealand
Oil and gas companies of New Zealand
Companies based in Auckland
Cooperatives in New Zealand